Ray Bronson (August 1887 – January 1948) briefly claimed the World Welterweight Boxing Title between February and December 1912.

Early life
Like so many boxers of his era, Bronson was forced to begin earning a living at an early age.  After working as a messenger boy, he became an apprentice horseshoer in an Indianapolis blacksmith shop.  As his strength improved, he was often given the task of shoeing the strongest, and most defiant horses.  His youthful career as a blacksmith strengthened his arms, and shoulders, and even helped create endurance, all essential skills for a successful boxer. He became a member of the Horseshoer's Union in October 1905, and served as a delegate of the Central Labor Union through 1907.

Early boxing career
At least according to BoxRec, Bronson had begun his professional boxing career by the age of seventeen in early 1905, and although the location of many of his early fights remains unclear, he fought often in his hometown of Indianapolis and occasionally in adjacent Illinois.  In his first four years of boxing, he fought at least 44 fights, losing only twice in those bouts listed by BoxRec, once to Grover Hayes, and once to Mickey Ford, both in Indiana, and both by knockout.

In a memorable bout on March 5, 1909, he lost in a thirteenth-round TKO to the great Freddie Welsh in a lightweight bout in Gretna, Louisiana.  On September 19, 1909, he drew with Packey McFarland on points in a full twenty-round bout in McDonoughville, Louisiana.  The local New Orleans Daily Picayune gave the bout to McFarland, however.  The Washington Evening Star called the bout "a hard, fast battle all the way", and noted that both boxers were near the lightweight limit, weighing in at around 134 pounds.

On June 30, 1910, Bronson managed to defeat future welterweight world champion Jack Britton at the Royal Athletic Club in New Orleans in a ten-round points decision.

Claiming the World Welterweight Title
Bronson first claimed the World Welterweight Title, according to most sources, in his bout with Young Erne on February 22, 1912, in Indianapolis, Indiana.  He won the bout, according to the Indianapolis Star in a ten-round points decision.

One of Bronson's most famous opponents was Packey McFarland.  Bronson fought a ten-round, no-decision bout three months after taking the Welterweight Title against McFarland at Independence Hall in Indianapolis on May 29, 1912.  Though a no-decision bout, most newspapers gave the edge to McFarland, an American boxing legend who somehow never claimed a world title despite being nearly undefeated in his career.  A large crowd had assembled perhaps as a result of the Indianapolis 500 soon to follow. The Milwaukee Journal wrote, "Packey McFarland gave Ray Bronson an artistic lacing in a spiteful ten-round fight before a big crowd of fans." The New London Day wrote, "McFarland had the better of eight rounds, and Bronson managed to break even in the other two."

According to one source, Bronson was one of only two boxers to ever knock down the legendary Packey McFarland in a fight, a feat he managed in their previous 1909 twenty-round bout in New Orleans.  As the fight was a no-decision, Bronson retained his title.

Bronson defended his title against boxers Clarence English, Harry Brewer, Wildcat Ferns and Hillard Lang.  He lost the American version of the World title on January 13, 1913, to Spike Kelly in an eight-round points decision in Memphis, Tennessee.  He more formally lost the World Title against Waldemar Holberg in Melbourne, Victoria, Australia on January 1, 1914, in a twenty-round points decision that was clearly billed as a World Welterweight Title fight, or at least the Australian version.

On February 8, 1914, he lost to Matt Wells, a future World Welterweight Title holder, and on September 6, 1920, he lost to Jack Britton another future World Welterweight champion.  While in Australia, Bronson tried his hand at managing other boxers.  The Tacoma Times wrote in July 1914, that Bronson was managing welterweight Milburn Saylor, and that, "Bronson has a number of crack battlers under his wing," which included Al Morey, an Australian welterweight.

Retirement from boxing
Bronson retired from active professional boxing around 1921 and died in 1948.

Professional boxing record
All information in this section is derived from BoxRec, unless otherwise stated.

Official record

All newspaper decisions are officially regarded as “no decision” bouts and are not counted in the win/loss/draw column.

Unofficial record

Record with the inclusion of newspaper decisions in the win/loss/draw column.

References

1887 births
1948 deaths
People from Indianapolis
Boxers from Indiana
World boxing champions
World welterweight boxing champions
Welterweight boxers
American male boxers